is a passenger railway station located in the city of Yoshinogawa, Tokushima Prefecture, Japan. It is operated by JR Shikoku and has the station number "B14".

Lines

Layout
The station consists of a side platform serving a single track. The station building is unstaffed and serves only as a waiting room. There are some steps at the entrance to the station building and a further flight of steps is needed to reach the platform, rendering the station inaccessible to wheelchair users.

Adjacent stations

History
When the company was nationalized on 1 September 1907, Japanese Government Railways (JGR) took over control of the station and operated it as part of the Tokushima Line (later the Tokushima Main Line). On 1 April 1957, Japanese National Railways (JNR), the successor of JGR, changed the name of the station to Awa-Yamakawa. With the privatization of Japanese National Railways (JNR) on 1 April 1987, the station came under the control of JR Shikoku. On 1 June 1988, the line was renamed the Tokushima Line.

Passenger statistics
In fiscal 2014, the station was used by an average of 381 passengers daily.

Surrounding area
Yoshinogawa City Yamakawa Government Building
Yoshinogawa City Yamakawa Library
Yoshinogawa City Yamakawa Junior High School

See also
 List of Railway Stations in Japan

References

External links

 JR Shikoku timetable

Railway stations in Tokushima Prefecture
Railway stations in Japan opened in 1900
Yoshinogawa, Tokushima